The Fiestas de Quito (celebrations of Quito) is a weeklong period from the end of November to 6 December celebrating the foundation of Quito. During this period, bullfighting at the Plaza de Toros, flamenco dancing, opera and theater shows are presented. Parades that present the new Reina de Quito, marching school war bands, and other events can be enjoyed. In addition to celebrating the founding of Quito, some neighborhoods celebrate their favorite saint and for processions and block parties with live music and bands. People can also take a ride around the city on a Chiva, which is an open "party" bus with live bands. Plaza Foch is also a destination for the people because of its vast space with restaurants, bars, clubs, hotels, shops and special events.

References 

Tourist attractions in Quito
Festivals in Ecuador